Gary Henderson may refer to:

Gary Henderson (baseball coach), American college baseball coach 
Gary Henderson (playwright) (born 1955), New Zealand playwright, director and teacher
Gary Henderson (tennis) (born 1969), British former professional tennis player